Gompholobium inconspicuum, commonly known as creeping wedge-pea is a species of flowering plant in the family Fabaceae and is endemic to south-eastern continental Australia. It is a prostrate or low-lying shrub with trifoliate leaves and pale lemon yellow to yellowish green, pea-like flowers.

Description

Taxonomy and naming
Gompholobium inconspicuum was first formally described in 1995 by Michael Crisp in the journal Muelleria from specimens collected near Windsor in 1994. The specific epithet (inconspicuum) refers to the difficulty of finding the plants amongst grass tufts.

Distribution
Creeping wedge-pea grows in forest in rocky places, mainly south from near Putty in New South Wales to the Genoa River in far north-eastern Victoria.

References

inconspicuum
Mirbelioids
Fabales of Australia
Flora of New South Wales
Flora of Victoria (Australia)
Taxa named by Michael Crisp
Plants described in 1995